Laughter is the third studio album by English rock group The Mighty Lemon Drops. Released on Chrysalis/Sire in 1989, the album was the band's first to feature David Newton as the primary songwriter, as co-writer and bassist Tony Linehan quit early during the recording sessions. The album contains the hit U.S. modern rock singles "Into the Heart of Love" and "Where Do We Go From Heaven".

Background and recording
The Mighty Lemon Drops, feeling wrongly pigeonholed from their previous works as a "doom and gloom" band, decided in early 1989 to name their new album Laughter to reflect the group's shift in musical direction and to distance themselves from other bands with whom they had often been compared. Guitarist and songwriter David Newton explained, "There's definitely more lightness as opposed to all the dark stuff we've done. We wanted to lose all that. People are really amazed when they hear us. The press would lead you to believe that the only reason we exist is because of Echo and the Bunnymen. I don't even like them."

During the sessions for Laughter, bassist and co-writer Tony Linehan left the band after recording two tracks for the album, "All That I Can Do" and "Second Time Around". In a 2012 interview, Newton said of Linehan's departure: "We had spent the best part of four years with each other most days, and that will magnify any differences personality-wise or musically you might have. It was a stupid situation really and Tony now considers it a mistake on his part to leave, but we were also still quite young and things like this happen." 
Linehan was replaced by Marcus Williams, who had played with Julian Cope. Singer Paul Marsh credited Williams for bringing a fresh approach to the band which helped result in the poppier direction evident on Laughter, which features a horn section, layered guitars, and a live sound.

Reception

Released in September 1989, Laughter produced two singles that reached the top 10 of the U.S. Modern Rock Tracks chart: "Into the Heart of Love" (number five) and "Where Do We Go From Heaven" (number eight). The album peaked at number 195 on the Billboard 200 in March 1990.

Dave Schulps and Ira Robbins of Trouser Press called Laughter "an altogether great album which remains by far the band's best" and compared it to the "psychedelically tinged pop joy of Stone Roses' debut, released in the same year". 
Robin Reinhardt of Spin said Laughter combines the "raw energy of Happy Head with the fuller, tighter sounds of World Without End". 
Reviews from the British press were generally less positive, however, leading the band to concentrate its promotion efforts in the U.S., including a 70-date concert tour with labelmates The Ocean Blue and John Wesley Harding.

Track listing

Personnel

The Mighty Lemon Drops
 Paul Marsh – vocals
 David Newton – guitars, backing vocals
 Marcus Williams – bass guitar, backing vocals on tracks 1–7, 10, 11
 Keith Rowley – drums
 Tony Linehan – bass guitar on tracks 8, 9

Additional
 Ian Devaney – brass
 Luís Jardim – percussion
 Stevie Lange – backing vocals
 Andy Morris – brass
 Alex White – keyboards

Charts

References

1989 albums
Chrysalis Records albums
Sire Records albums
Albums produced by Tim Palmer
The Mighty Lemon Drops albums